The 2021 Sánchez-Casal Cup was a professional tennis tournament played on clay courts. It was the fourth edition of the tournament which was part of the 2021 ATP Challenger Tour. It took place in Barcelona, Spain between 4 and 10 October 2021.

Singles main-draw entrants

Seeds

 1 Rankings are as of 27 September 2021.

Other entrants
The following players received wildcards into the singles main draw:
  Pablo Llamas Ruiz
  Alejandro Moro Cañas
  Nikolás Sánchez Izquierdo

The following player received entry into the singles main draw as an alternate:
  Adrian Andreev

The following players received entry from the qualifying draw:
  Nicolás Álvarez Varona
  Georgii Kravchenko
  Matteo Martineau
  Yshai Oliel

The following players received entry as lucky losers:
  Oleksii Krutykh
  Álvaro López San Martín

Champions

Singles

  Dimitar Kuzmanov def.  Hugo Gaston 6–3, 6–0.

Doubles

  Harri Heliövaara /  Roman Jebavý def.  Nuno Borges /  Francisco Cabral 6–4, 6–3.

References

Sánchez-Casal Cup
2021 in Spanish tennis
October 2021 sports events in Spain